Dubai has a hot desert climate. Dubai has 4 seasons – winter, spring, fall, and summer. Summer in Dubai begins around the last week of April and ends around the first week of October. This period is characterized by extremely hot weather, hot winds and high humidity. Due to the city's close proximity to the sea, the temperatures in Dubai are slightly milder in summer in comparison to other Gulf cities such as Kuwait City and Riyadh. However, this means the city has high humidity which can make the weather extremely unpleasant in summer. Rainfall is scarce during the summer months, but the windy conditions ensure there are frequent dust storms. Temperatures regularly rise above  during this period and fall to around  overnight. Winter in Dubai begins around the last week of October and lasts until the beginning of April. The winter season has the most pleasant weather, making it ideal for outdoor activities. Most of the precipitation takes place during this season. Strong thunderstorms are not uncommon to the city during this period, this is accompanied by strong north-westerly winds and lower temperatures.

This can be clearly seen when comparing weather data from the city's two airports - Dubai International and Dubai World Central.

Classifications

Climate data

Seasonal climate 
The climate of Dubai is warm and sunny due to its position near the line of the Tropic of Cancer. Near coastal areas humidity averages between 50% and 60%. In the summer, the weather in Dubai is very hot and humid, with temperatures exceeding  mainly in the months of July and August. The sea temperature could also reach , with humidity averaging over 90%.
Rainfall in Dubai is infrequent and does not last for a long period. It mostly rains during the winter period between November and March in the form of short downpours and an occasional thunderstorm. On average, rain falls only 25 days a year.

The weather in Dubai is extremely dry in the month of June with little or no rain; however, heavy rain with thunderstorm can unexpectedly fall on some days in June, despite it is being the driest month in Dubai, with an example being June 21, 2019. March and December also record some amount of rainfall. The rainfall during January, April, July, October and November are about average while the amount of rain in May, August and September are comparatively lower.
The hottest months are July and August with the average high temperatures exceeding .

Climatic conditions by month 

The average rainfall is 10 mm (0.4 inches) of, with rain generally falling on just two days of the month. January is also known for having days of unusual precipitation events . On January 15, 2008,  of rain was recorded in 24 hours.

The average rainfall is  during February.

The average rainfall is  during March, with rain generally falling on just four days of the month. Strong thunderstorms often hit the city during this month, which if followed by an increase in temperatures.

The average rainfall is  during May, with rain generally falling on just one day of the month.

The average rainfall is less than  during June, with a possible chance of rainfall that could be expected to fall on one of the days of the month.

In July the average daytime temperature is extremely high  with extreme heat and humidity. The average rainfall is about  during July, with rain occasionally falling on just one of the days of the month. Strong thunderstorms often quickly develop during these summer months and hit the outskirts of the city in areas such as DWC Airport, Al Lisaili, Lahbab, Al Khawaneej, Al Awir and Muhaisnah areas, especially during the late afternoon.

In August the average daytime temperature is extremely high , with extreme heat and humidity. The average rainfall is less than  during August, with a possible chance of rainfall that could be expected to fall on one of the days of the month.

There is very little chance of any rainfall during September.

On average only  of rainfall may occur in November.

With rain generally falling on just 2 days of the month.

Sandstorms and Extreme Events 
During the summer season, a low pressure area develops over Dubai forcing strong north-westerly winds to blow from Saudi Arabia. These winds, also known as Shamal (north) in Arabic, become gusty and unpredictable on reaching Dubai. Shamal boosts up the desert sand and reduce visibility and the dust storm sandstorms may last for several days. Notable sandstorms and extreme weather events that hit Dubai during the last few years include:

 On April 18, 2008, a severe sandstorm hit Dubai and reduced visibility to 1,500 meters.
 On March 10, 2009, a moderate sandstorm reached Dubai which lowered down the visibility and temperature.
 On March 2, 2010, Strong winds caused sandstorms in Dubai and other regions of United Arab Emirates.
 On January 28, 2011, a sandstorm hit Dubai for a short time.
 On February 26, 2012, a strong sandstorm hit Dubai and other parts of the country.
 On April 2, 2015, a very strong sandstorm hit Dubai and other parts of the country. It started to clear out closer to the evening. In some areas visibility use reduced to 500 metres.
This is one of the rarest rainfall to ever occur in Dubai in the month of June.
From January 7 to around January 12, 2020, record-breaking rain hit Dubai and other regions of the UAE. The incessant storms brought strong winds and hailstorms and brought down temperatures severely. Unusually heavy rain hit Dubai, with rainfall reaching 150 mm/hour for 2.5 hours, according to preliminary reports, the storms also flooded various regions of the emirate, including the Dubai Airport, leading to the cancellation of most flights.
A cold wave hit the UAE from January 6 to 12, 2021. Temperatures dipped in Dubai as well.
 On July 17, 2021, dust and sandstorm hit Dubai followed by heavy rain. 
From December 31, 2021 to January 2, 2022, heavy rainfall hit Dubai, with most areas of the city receiving over 60 millimeters of rainfall in two days time and reaching to even 140 millimeters in various areas of the city. 
 From July 26 to 28, 2022, heavy rainfall lashed in Dubai along with other emirates including Sharjah, Ras al Khaimah and Fujairah. Large floods occurred in most areas due to the intense rain, affecting residents. 
 On August 14, 2022, a severe sandstorm hit Dubai and other emirates, reducing visibility to 500 meters.
 From January 25th to 27th 2023, record breaking rainfall hit Dubai, with a 100mm of rain falling in the span of just 3 days, further temperatures stayed below 18°C for 3 days.
 Though Dubai is located in a tropical area, the city and its suburbs were never hit by a depression or cyclonic storm in its past 1000 years due to its geomorphological location; however, with the shift in climate patterns and climate change, this could soon change.

Notes

References

External links 
 Dubai weather – UAE's National Center of Meteorology and Seismology
 Weather of Dubai
 Dreamsofdubai
 Climate-Charts.com
 Dubai Climate Change
 
 Adaptation Plan] – Emirates 24/7

Geography of Dubai
Climate of the United Arab Emirates
Dubai